= Celtic graphite pottery =

Celtic graphite pottery is the Polish term to describe a wheel thrown pottery which was made from clay with graphite fragments as an admixture. This is a characteristic type of ceramics for the La Tène culture whose discovery at Polish sites should be related to Celtic settlement or influences from the Celtic world. The most characteristic type is so-called graphite situla, but other vessels such as pots and bowls were also common.

== Dating ==
Graphite wheel thrown pottery occurs at Polish sites in layers dated to La Tène B to La Tène D and to the beginning of the Early Roman Period (1st century AD).

== Features ==
It is believed that adding graphite to clay makes it more resistant to high temperatures and external factors such as acids. Therefore, vessels made of clay with graphite could be used both for home use as well as in specialized production workshop.

== Finds ==
Finds of this type of pottery are grouped in south-eastern Poland. Most finds come from areas near Kraków which are referred to as the so-called Celtic settlement microregion.

== Sources ==
- Kaczanowski, P., & Kozłowski, J. K. (1998). Wielka historia Polski. Najdawniejsze dzieje ziem polskich (do VII w), Tom 1.
- Poleska, P. (2006). Celtycki mikroregion osadniczy w rejonie podkrakowskim.
- Woźniak, Z. (1970). Osadnictwo celtyckie w Polsce.
